Ralph Robert Erickson (born April 28, 1959) is an American lawyer who serves as a United States circuit judge of the United States Court of Appeals for the Eighth Circuit.

Education and career

Born in Thief River Falls, Minnesota, Erickson received a Bachelor of Arts degree from Jamestown College in 1980 and a Juris Doctor from the University of North Dakota School of Law in 1984. He was in private practice in West Fargo, North Dakota, from 1984 to 1994. He was a magistrate judge for the Cass County Court, North Dakota from 1993 to 1994. He was a county judge for the Traill, Steele, Nelson & Griggs Counties Court, North Dakota in 1994. He was a state district judge for the East Central Judicial District Court, North Dakota from 1995 to 2003.

Federal judicial service

District Court service
On January 7, 2003, Erickson was nominated by President George W. Bush to a seat on the United States District Court for the District of North Dakota vacated by Rodney Scott Webb. He was confirmed by the United States Senate on March 12, 2003, and received his commission on March 14, 2003. He served as chief judge from 2009 to 2016. His service on the district court terminated on October 13, 2017, upon elevation to the 8th Circuit Court.

Court of Appeals service
On June 7, 2017, President Donald Trump nominated Erickson to serve as a United States circuit judge of the United States Court of Appeals for the Eighth Circuit, to the seat vacated by Judge Kermit Edward Bye, who assumed senior status on April 22, 2015. A hearing on his nomination before the Senate Judiciary Committee took place on July 25, 2017. On September 14, 2017, his nomination was reported out of committee by a 20–0 vote. On September 28, 2017, the United States Senate invoked cloture on his nomination by a 95–1 vote. His nomination was confirmed that same day by a 95–1 vote. He received his judicial commission on October 12, 2017. He is the chairperson of the United States Judicial Conference Committee on Codes of Conduct.

References

External links

 Erickson at Eighth Circuit Court of Appeals

|-

|-

|-

1959 births
Living people
20th-century American lawyers
20th-century American judges
21st-century American lawyers
21st-century American judges
Judges of the United States District Court for the District of North Dakota
Judges of the United States Court of Appeals for the Eighth Circuit
North Dakota lawyers
North Dakota state court judges
People from West Fargo, North Dakota
United States magistrate judges
United States district court judges appointed by George W. Bush
United States court of appeals judges appointed by Donald Trump
University of Jamestown alumni